

Ælfric (died ) was a medieval Bishop of Crediton.

Ælfric was elected to Crediton between 977 and 979. He died between 986 and 987.

Citations

References

External links
 

Bishops of Crediton (ancient)
10th-century English bishops
980s deaths
Year of birth unknown
Year of death uncertain